Buse Lake Protected Area, informally  known as Buse Lake Provincial Park, is a provincial park in British Columbia, Canada, 23 km east-southeast of Kamloops near Monte Creek. It was created in 2000 as part of the outcome of the Kamloops Landuse and Resource Management Plan (KLRMP) and is 228 hectares in size.

References

External links
BCGNIS listing "Buse Lake"

Provincial parks of British Columbia
Thompson Country
2000 establishments in British Columbia
Protected areas established in 2000